is a professional Japanese baseball player. He plays pitcher for the Tokyo Yakult Swallows.

References 

1998 births
Living people
Baseball people from Chiba Prefecture
Keio University alumni
Japanese baseball players
Nippon Professional Baseball pitchers
Tokyo Yakult Swallows players